Bériaboukro is a village in south-central Ivory Coast. It is in the sub-prefecture of Kokumbo, Toumodi Department, Bélier Region, Lacs District. The village sits on the east side of the river that forms the border with Gôh-Djiboua District.

Bériaboukro was a commune until March 2012, when it became one of 1126 communes nationwide that were abolished.

Notes

Former communes of Ivory Coast
Populated places in Lacs District
Populated places in Bélier